The Bataan Death March (Filipino: Martsa ng Kamatayan sa Bataan; Spanish: Marcha de la muerte de Bataán; Kapampangan: Martsa ning Kematayan quing Bataan; Japanese: バターン死の行進, Hepburn: Batān Shi no Kōshin) was the forcible transfer by the Imperial Japanese Army of between 75,000  American and Filipino prisoners of war from Saysain Point, Bagac, Bataan and Mariveles to Camp O'Donnell, Capas, Tarlac, via San Fernando, Pampanga, the prisoners being forced to march despite many dying on the journey.

The transfer began on April 9, 1942, after the three-month Battle of Bataan in the Philippines during World War II. The total distance marched from Mariveles to San Fernando and from the Capas Train Station to various camps was 65 miles long. Sources also report widely differing prisoner of war casualties prior to reaching Camp O'Donnell: from 5,000 to 18,000 Filipino deaths and 500 to 650 American deaths during the march. If an American soldier was caught on the ground or fell, he would be instantly shot. All the American soldiers who are known to have died or were killed now have a gravestone honoring them.

The march was characterized by severe physical abuse and wanton killings. After the war, the Japanese commander, General Masaharu Homma and two of his officers, Major General Yoshitaka Kawane and Colonel Kurataro Hirano, were tried by United States military commissions for war crimes and sentenced to death on charges of failing to prevent their subordinates from committing war crimes. Homma was executed in 1946, while Kawane and Hirano were executed in 1949.

Background

Prelude
When General Douglas MacArthur returned to active duty, the latest revision of plans for the defense of the Philippine Islands—called WPO-3—was politically unrealistic, assuming a conflict only involving the United States and Japan, not the combined Axis powers. However, the plan was tactically sound, and its provisions for defense were applicable under any local situation.

Under WPO-3, the mission of the Philippine garrison was to hold the entrance to Manila Bay and deny its use to Japanese naval forces. If the enemy prevailed, the Americans were to make every attempt to hold back the Japanese advance while withdrawing to the Bataan Peninsula, which was recognized as the key to the control of Manila Bay. It was to be defended to the "last extremity". General MacArthur assumed command of the Allied army in July 1941 and rejected WPO-3 as defeatist, preferring a more aggressive course of action. He recommended—among other things—a coastal defense strategy that would include the entire archipelago. His recommendations were followed in the plan that was eventually approved.

The main force of General Masaharu Homma's 14th Army came ashore at Lingayen Gulf on the morning of December 22. The defenders failed to hold the beaches. By the end of the day, the Japanese had secured most of their objectives and were in position to emerge onto the central plain. Late in the afternoon of the 23rd, Wainwright telephoned General MacArthur's headquarters in Manila and informed him that any further defense of the Lingayen beaches was "impracticable". He requested and was given permission to withdraw behind the Agno River. MacArthur decided to abandon his own plan for defense and revert to WPO-3, evacuating President Manuel L. Quezon, High Commissioner Francis B. Sayre, their families, and his own headquarters to Corregidor on the 24th. A rear echelon, headed by the deputy chief of staff, Brigadier General Richard J. Marshall, remained behind in Manila to close out the headquarters and to supervise the shipment of supplies and the evacuation of the remaining troops.

On December 26, Manila was officially declared an open city and MacArthur's proclamation was published in the newspapers and broadcast over the radio.

The Battle of Bataan began on January 7, 1942, and continued until April 9, when the USAFFE commander, Major General Edward King Jr., surrendered to Colonel Mootoo Nakayama of the 14th Japanese Army.

Allied surrender
Lieutenant General Masaharu Homma and his staff encountered almost twice as many captives as his reports had estimated, creating an enormous logistical challenge: the transport and movement of over 60,000 starved, sick, and debilitated prisoners and over 38,000 equally weakened civilian noncombatants who had been caught up in the battle. He wanted to move prisoners and refugees to the north to get them out of the way of Homma's final assault on Corregidor, but there was simply not enough mechanized transport for the wounded, sick, and weakened masses.

The March

Following the surrender of Bataan on April 9, 1942, to the Imperial Japanese Army, prisoners were massed in the towns of Mariveles and Bagac. They were ordered to turn over their possessions. American Lieutenant Kermit Lay recounted how this was done:

Word quickly spread among the prisoners to conceal or destroy any Japanese money or mementos, as their captors would assume it had been stolen from dead Japanese soldiers.

"One of the POWs had a ring on and the Japanese guard       attempted to get the ring off," said one U.S. prisoner. "He couldn't get it off and he took a machete and cut the man's wrist off and when he did that, of course the man was bleeding profusely. [I tried to help him] but when I looked back I saw a Japanese guard sticking a bayonet through his stomach."

Prisoners started out from Mariveles on April 10, and Bagac on April 11, converging in Pilar, Bataan, and heading north to the San Fernando railhead. At the beginning, there were rare instances of kindness by Japanese officers and those Japanese soldiers who spoke English, such as the sharing of food and cigarettes and permitting personal possessions to be kept. This, however, was quickly followed by unrelenting brutality, theft, and even knocking men's teeth out for gold fillings, as the common Japanese soldier had also suffered in the battle for Bataan and had nothing but disgust and hatred for his "captives" (Japan did not recognize these people as POWs). The first atrocity—attributed to Colonel Masanobu Tsuji—occurred when approximately 350 to 400 Filipino officers and NCOs under his supervision were summarily executed in the Pantingan River massacre after they had surrendered. Tsuji—acting against General Homma's wishes that the prisoners be transferred peacefully—had issued clandestine orders to Japanese officers to summarily execute all American "captives". Although some Japanese officers ignored the orders, others were receptive to the idea of murdering POWs.

During the march, prisoners received little food or water, and many died. They were subjected to severe physical abuse, including beatings and torture. On the march, the "sun treatment" was a common form of torture. Prisoners were forced to sit in sweltering direct sunlight without helmets or other head coverings. Anyone who asked for water was shot dead. Some men were told to strip naked or sit within sight of fresh, cool water. Trucks drove over some of those who fell or succumbed to fatigue, and "cleanup crews" put to death those too weak to continue, though some trucks picked up some of those too fatigued to go on. Some marchers were randomly stabbed with bayonets or beaten.

Once the surviving prisoners arrived in Balanga, the overcrowded conditions and poor hygiene caused dysentery and other diseases to spread rapidly. The Japanese did not provide the prisoners with medical care, so U.S. medical personnel tended to the sick and wounded with few or no supplies. Upon arrival at the San Fernando railhead, prisoners were stuffed into sweltering, brutally hot metal box cars for the one-hour trip to Capas, in  heat. At least 100 prisoners were pushed into each of the unventilated boxcars. The trains had no sanitation facilities, and disease continued to take a heavy toll on the prisoners. According to Staff Sergeant Alf Larson:

Upon arrival at the Capas train station, they were forced to walk the final  to Camp O'Donnell. Even after arriving at Camp O'Donnell, the survivors of the march continued to die at rates of up to several hundred per day, which amounted to a death toll of as many as 20,000 Americans and Filipinos. Most of the dead were buried in mass graves that the Japanese had dug behind the barbed wire surrounding the compound. Of the estimated 80,000 POWs at the march, only 54,000 made it to Camp O'Donnell.

The Death March was later judged by an Allied military commission to be a Japanese war crime.

Casualty estimates

The only serious attempt to calculate the number of deaths during the march on the basis of evidence is that of Stanley L. Falk. He takes the number of American and Filipino troops known to have been present in Bataan at the start of April, subtracts the number known to have escaped to Corregidor and the number known to have remained in the hospital at Bataan. He makes a conservative estimate of the number killed in the final days of fighting and of the number who fled into the jungle rather than surrender to the Japanese. On this basis he suggests 600 to 650 American deaths and 5,000 to 10,000 Filipino deaths. Other sources report death numbers ranging from 5,000 to 18,000 Filipino deaths and 500 to 650 American deaths during the march.

Wartime public responses

United States

It was not until January 27, 1944, that the U.S. government informed the American public about the march, when it released sworn statements of military officers who had escaped. Shortly thereafter, the stories of these officers were featured in a Life magazine article. The Bataan Death March and other Japanese actions were used to arouse fury in the United States. America would go on to avenge its defeat that occured in the Philippines during the Island of Leyte in October 1944. When General Douglas MacArthur famously promised to return to the Philippines, and he kept his word in February 1945, U.S. and Filipino forces went on to recapture the Bataan Peninsula, and shortly after the Capitol city of Manila was liberated in early March.

General George Marshall made the following statement:

Japanese
In an attempt to counter the American propaganda value of the march, the Japanese had The Manila Times report that the prisoners were treated humanely and their death rate had to be attributed to the intransigence of the American commanders who did not surrender until the men were on the verge of death.

War crimes trial

In September 1945, General Masaharu Homma was arrested by Allied troops and indicted for war crimes. He was charged with 43 separate counts but the verdict did not distinguish among them, leaving some doubt over whether he was found guilty of them all. Homma was found guilty of permitting members of his command to commit "brutal atrocities and other high crimes". The general, who had been absorbed in his efforts to capture Corregidor after the fall of Bataan, claimed in his defense that he remained ignorant of the high death toll of the death march until two months after the event. Homma's verdict was predicated on the doctrine of respondeat superior, but with an added liability standard, since the latter could not be rebutted. On February 26, 1946, he was sentenced to death by firing squad, and was executed on April 3 outside Manila.

Masanobu Tsuji, who had directly ordered the killing of POWs, fled to China from Thailand when the war ended to escape the British authorities.

Two of Homma's subordinates, Major General Yoshitaka Kawane and Colonel Kurataro Hirano, were prosecuted by an American military commission in Yokohama in 1948, using evidence presented at the Homma trial. They were sentenced to death by hanging, and executed at Sugamo Prison in June 12, 1949.

Post-war commemorations, apologies, and memorials

On September 13, 2010, Japanese Foreign Minister Katsuya Okada apologized to a group of six former American soldiers who had been held as prisoners of war by the Japanese, including 90-year-old Lester Tenney and Robert Rosendahl, both survivors of the Bataan Death March. The six, their families, and the families of two deceased soldiers were invited to visit Japan at the expense of the Japanese government.

In 2012, film producer Jan Thompson created a film documentary about the Death March, POW camps, and Japanese hell ships titled Never the Same: The Prisoner-of-War Experience. The film reproduced scenes of the camps and ships showed drawings and writings of the prisoners, and featured Loretta Swit as the narrator.

Dozens of memorials (including monuments, plaques, and schools) dedicated to the prisoners who died during the Bataan Death March exist across the United States and in the Philippines. A wide variety of commemorative events are held to honor the victims, including holidays, athletic events such as ultramarathons, and memorial ceremonies held at military cemeteries.

New Mexico 

The Bataan Death March had a large impact on New Mexico, given that many of the American soldiers in Bataan were from that state, specifically from the 200th and 515th Coast Artillery of the National Guard. The New Mexico National Guard Bataan Memorial Museum is located in the Armory where the soldiers of the 200th and 515th were processed before their deployment to the Philippines in 1941.

The old state capitol building of New Mexico was renamed the Bataan Memorial Building and now houses several state government agency offices.

Every year, in early spring, the Bataan Memorial Death March, a marathon-length  march/run is conducted at the White Sands Missile Range, New Mexico. On March 19, 2017, over 6,300 participants queued up at the starting line for the 28th annual event, breaking not only all previous records of attendance but also the amount of non-perishable food collected for local food pantries and overall charitable goods donated.

The 200th and 515th Coast Artillery units had 1,816 men total. 829 died in battle, while prisoners, or immediately after liberation. There were 987 survivors. , of the veterans of the 200th and 515th who survived the Bataan Death March, 69 were still alive. , only four of these veterans remained.

Diego Garcia, British Indian Ocean Territory 
Due to the large population of Filipino workers on the island of Diego Garcia, in the British Indian Ocean Territory, an annual memorial march is held. The date varies but the marchers leave from the Marina around 06:00 traveling by boat to Barton Point, where they proceed south to the Plantation ruins. The memorial march is conducted by Filipino workers, British Royal Marines, British Royal Military Police, and United States sailors from various commands across the island.

Notable captives and survivors

 José Agdamag
 Ramon Bagatsing
 Bert Bank
 Lewis C. Beebe
 Bull Benini
 Clifford Bluemel
 Albert Braun
 Thomas F. Breslin
 William E. Brougher
 Albert Brown
 Jose Calugas
 Mariano Castañeda
 Lawrence S. Churchill
 Virgilio N. Cordero Jr.
 Charles C. Drake
 William Dyess
 Alva R. Fitch
 Halstead C. Fowler
 Arnold J. Funk
 Martin Gison
 Samuel A. Goldblith
 Samuel Grashio
 Samuel L. Howard
 Ray C. Hunt
 Delfin Jaranilla
 Harold Keith Johnson
 Albert M. Jones
 Joe Kieyoomia
 Edward P. King
 Jesse Monroe Knowles
 Charles S. Lawrence
 Maxon S. Lough
 Robert W. Levering
 Jose B. Lingad
 Vicente Lim
 Ferdinand Marcos
 Allan C. McBride
 George F. Moore
 John E. Olson
 George M. Parker
 Clinton A. Pierce
 Salvador A. Rodolfo Sr.
 Alejo Santos
 Alfredo M. Santos
 Robert Sheats
 Austin Shofner
 Benigno G. Tabora
 Robert P. Taylor
 Mario Tonelli
 Thomas J. H. Trapnell
 James R.N. Weaver
 Edgar Whitcomb
 Manuel T. Yan
 Teófilo Yldefonso
 Ben Skardon
 Leland D. Bartlett

See also

References

Citations

Further reading
 Abraham, Abie (1997). "Oh God Where Are You?" . Vantage Press. 
 Abraham, Abie (2001). Ghost of Bataan Speaks. Beaver Pond. 
 
 
 
 
 
 
 
 
 
 
 
 
 
 
 Also see: Webcast interview with the authors at the Pritzker Military Library on September 24, 2009

External links

 Tragedy of Bataan
 No Uncle Sam: The Forgotten of Bataan – A link to the book's page on the publisher's website
 Hell's Guest author Colonel Glenn Frazier, Bataan Death March Survivor
 "Back to Bataan, A Survivor's Story" – A narrative recounting one soldier's journey through Bataan, the march, prison camp, Japan, and back home to the United States. Includes a map of the march.
 The Bataan Death March – Information, maps, and pictures on the march itself and in-depth information on Japanese POW camps.
 "Technical Sergeant Jim Brown U.S. Army Air Corps (ret) Bataan Death March Survivor Presentation to EAA Chapter 108 May 16, 2000" 
 Proviso East High School Bataan Commemorative Research Project – Comprehensive history of the Battle for Bataan, the Death March and the role of the 192nd Tank Battalion
 4th Marines at Corregidor and Bataan Death March
 1200 Days, A Bataan POW Survivor's Story A biography of Russell A. Grokett's survival of the Bataan Death March, including three years as a Japanese Prisoner of War.
 Japan Focus 2008
  Bataan Death March and POW Camps and Bataan Survivors Recall Horrors, Borderlands articles

 
Philippines in World War II
Japanese war crimes
Massacres committed by Japan
Forced marches
World War II prisoner of war massacres
1942 in the Philippines
Death March
United States Marine Corps in World War II
World War II sites in the Philippines
World War II sites of the United States
April 1942 events